The San Jose Earthquakes are an American professional soccer club based in San Jose, California.  The Earthquakes compete as a member club of the Western Conference of Major League Soccer (MLS). Originally as the San Jose Clash, the franchise began play in 1996 as one of the charter members of the league. The Earthquakes took part in the first game in MLS history, defeating D.C. United 1–0. The Earthquakes have won two MLS Cup titles (2001, 2003) and two Supporters' Shields (2005, 2012). In 2002, the team played in its first CONCACAF Champions Cup (now called the CONCACAF Champions League), making it to the quarterfinals. 
The team holds a fierce rivalry with the LA Galaxy known as the California Clásico.

In 2005, the then-owner of the Earthquakes, Anschutz Entertainment Group, announced plans of the team relocating to Houston due to failing efforts to secure a soccer-specific stadium in San Jose. The organization in Houston would be considered an expansion team by the league, eventually becoming the Houston Dynamo, which began play in 2006. The Earthquakes returned after a two-year hiatus, resuming play in 2008. Since 2015, the Earthquakes have played their home games at PayPal Park (named Avaya Stadium from 2015 to 2019 and Earthquakes Stadium in 2020). The team previously played its home games at Buck Shaw Stadium on the Santa Clara University campus in Santa Clara, California from 2008 to 2014.

History

Founding and early years (1994–1999) 

In 1994, Daniel Van Voorhis, former owner of the American Professional Soccer League's San Jose Hawks, successfully led a San Jose bidding group that was awarded one of Major League Soccer's inaugural teams. At that time, he handed over all existing Hawks player contracts, front-office resources and the rights to play in San Jose State University's Spartan Stadium to MLS in exchange for Type C stock in the league. He also became the franchise's investor-operator until outside concerns forced him to divest himself of these positions prior to the league's launch and accept a buyout from the league, leaving the franchise league-owned for several years. Meanwhile, a direct connection to the earlier Earthquakes came in the person of Peter Bridgwater, named as general manager of the MLS team. Although Bridgwater still owned the rights to the Earthquakes name and logo, the team became known as the Clash at the urging of Nike, a major investor in MLS.

On December 7, 1995, Bridgwater hired Laurie Calloway as the team's first coach, providing a second direct connection with the NASL Earthquakes, as well as a connection with the Hawks. On January 23, 1996, the Clash acquired US national team star Eric Wynalda, despite the fact that Wynalda and Calloway did not get along during their time together with the Hawks. The Clash's connections to the Blackhawks continued when the club made the first trade in MLS history, sending Rhett Harty to the MetroStars for Troy Dayak.

San Jose was an integral part of the launching of MLS, hosting the league's inaugural game at Spartan Stadium before a crowd of 31,683 on April 6, 1996. The crowd did not go away disappointed as San Jose won its first game on the first goal in MLS history from Eric Wynalda, defeating D.C. United 1–0. One month later, the club made history again, as they hosted the Los Angeles Galaxy in a match that drew 31,728 fans to Spartan Stadium, setting the record for attendance at a sporting event in the city of San Jose. But Wynalda and Calloway were soon at each other's throats again, eventually leading to a locker room brawl between Wynalda and John Doyle. The skirmish reached memorable proportions when Wynalda hired an airplane to tow a banner demanding Calloway's firing.

Although the Clash made the postseason in the inaugural MLS season in 1996, and Doyle earned recognition as the best MLS defender, the team floundered in 1997. By mid-season the team was sinking fast and Bridgwater fired Calloway and replaced him with Brian Quinn. The Clash finished 1997 at the bottom of the Western Conference standings with a 12–20 record. Things were no better in 1998, when the team finished 13–19 and well out of playoff contention. During the 1999 pre-season, the saga of player-coach antagonism continued when Richard Gough left the team after an argument with Quinn. By the end of 1999, Quinn was done and the team released him to hire Lothar Osiander.

Return of the Earthquakes (1999–2005) 

The franchise's official name changed from the Clash to the Earthquakes on October 27, 1999. After missing four consecutive post-seasons with three different coaches, the Earthquakes hired head coach Frank Yallop days before the 2001 MLS SuperDraft.  Yallop's personnel changes and deft coaching with the help of assistant coach Dominic Kinnear and goalkeeper coach Tim Hanley, along with the allocation of star forward Landon Donovan on loan from Bayer Leverkusen, quickly turned around the Earthquakes' on-field fortunes, spurring the biggest regular season turnaround in league history (from 29 points in 2000 to 45 points in 2001) and leading the team to a 2–1 MLS Cup 2001 overtime victory over the archrival Los Angeles Galaxy.

The Quakes followed with two consecutive runners-up finishes for the MLS Supporters' Shield and a 4–2 MLS Cup 2003 win over the Chicago Fire. Prior to reaching the 2003 final, the Earthquakes had rallied from four goals down to beat the Galaxy, 5–4 on aggregate, in a first-round playoff that many MLS watchers described as the greatest in league history. Following the season, Yallop returned to his native Canada to coach the Canadian men's national soccer team being named to the post on December 16. Assistant coach Kinnear was then promoted to head coach, and former San Jose player John Doyle was named as his assistant.

Having won two MLS Cup titles in three years, the Earthquakes were poised for greater success both on and off the field.  However, in January 2004, general manager Johnny Moore, whose roots with the club dated back to his days as a player for the NASL Earthquakes, resigned after AEG and MLS considered allowing the team to be rebranded as San Jose America (with ownership to transfer to the owners of Mexico's Club América).  Earthquake fans were similarly outraged at the proposed rebranding, coming just months after the MLS Cup. Former Los Angeles Galaxy defender Alexi Lalas was named as Moore's replacement. Under Lalas' management, the club planned a move to Houston. Meanwhile, when the Quakes' star player, Landon Donovan, played briefly in Germany, Lalas traded away his rights, enabling Lalas' former team, the Galaxy, to acquire him.

On the field, Kinnear led the team to two more playoff appearances, including an MLS Supporters' Shield win in 2005.

Hiatus and return (2006–2008) 
Following the conclusion of the 2005 season, on December 15, the then owner of the San Jose Earthquakes, Anschutz Entertainment Group, announced that the team was moving to Houston for the 2006 season because of the failure of efforts to secure a soccer-specific stadium for the team in San Jose. However, MLS Commissioner Don Garber said that the Earthquakes' name, colors, logo, wordmark, history and competitive records would not be transferred, similar to the Cleveland Browns deal in the National Football League. The San Jose franchise was officially put on hiatus while the players, head coach Dominic Kinnear and some of his coaching staff were moved to Houston, where they became, first, Houston 1836, then Houston Dynamo. The Houston Dynamo is technically considered an expansion team by MLS just as the Baltimore Ravens is by the NFL.

On May 24, 2006, an agreement was reached between Major League Soccer and the principal owners of the Oakland Athletics baseball team, Lewis Wolff and John Fisher, granting them a three-year exclusive option to develop a soccer-specific stadium and bring an expansion franchise to the San Francisco Bay Area.

In September 2006, after nearly nine months of inactivity (displaying only Commissioner Garber's December 2005 letter of condolence to Earthquakes fans over the team's relocation), the team's website was revived to display updates on the progress of starting up the expansion San Jose Earthquakes franchise and to allow fans to sign up for the Earthquakes Soccer, LLC e-newsletter.

On July 18, 2007, Commissioner Don Garber announced that the San Jose Earthquakes would resume play starting in the 2008 season after Lew Wolff exercised his option to purchase the new expansion team. While functionally being the 14th franchise to join MLS, the team retained all records, logos, colors and titles of the 1996–2005 franchise and is a continuation of that franchise. Michael Crowley, also Oakland A's president at the time, led the relaunched franchise and served as president until 2010.

In October 2007 the Earthquakes announced they would be moving their offices from the Fairmont Hotel in downtown San Jose to an office park across the street from their temporary home, Buck Shaw Stadium, and across the Caltrain tracks from the location of the former FMC site.

On November 6, 2007, the team announced that former Earthquakes coach Frank Yallop was returning to the team as head coach. According to ESPN.com, the Earthquakes compensated Yallop's previous employer, the Los Angeles Galaxy, with a third-round pick in the 2008 MLS SuperDraft.

Return to MLS 

In 2008, England's Darren Huckerby, the MLS Newcomer of the Year and Ireland's Ronnie O'Brien, who made 28 appearances for the Earthquakes, helped anchor the offense, combining for 10 goals and 10 assists. Both played a key part of the team's nine-game unbeaten streak that saw San Jose push towards a playoff berth. They also failed to qualify for the U.S Open Cup, losing to Real Salt Lake 4–0 in the first round of qualifying.

On January 27, 2009, Amway Global signed a three-year deal with the Earthquakes to become the team's official jersey sponsor. The club made an historic trade on June 9, 2009, when they acquired Chris Wondolowski from Houston.

The Quakes missed out on the playoffs for a second consecutive season in 2009 but looked to build on a solid second half of the year, which saw them go 4–4–4 following the All-Star Break. The Earthquakes finished in 14th place and failed to qualify for the playoffs. The Earthquakes also failed to qualify for the U.S. Open Cup, losing to New York Red Bulls on April 29, 2–1.

In 2010, the San Jose Earthquakes qualified for the playoffs as the West's No. 6 seed with 46 points. In the 2010 MLS playoffs, they were matched up with the No. 1 seeded New York Red Bulls. After losing the first game by a score of 1–0, the Earthquakes defeated the Red Bulls in the second game by a score of 3–1 to win the aggregate, 3–2, and upset New York. In the single-elimination semi-final match against the Colorado Rapids, at Colorado, the Quakes suffered a 1–0 defeat.

In 2011, the San Jose Earthquakes missed the playoffs after they finished seventh in the west and fourteenth in all of MLS.

The Goonies (2012–2014) 

In 2012, the San Jose Earthquakes had the best start in franchise history. The team established a habit of scoring late goals to tie or win games. The first was a match against Real Salt Lake on April 21, 2012, scoring 2 goals in stoppage time to win 3–1. The next week, a stoppage time goal produced a win against the Philadelphia Union. Two more games resulted in ties with late goals, both scored by Alan Gordon. On May 23, 2012, against the L.A. Galaxy, the Quakes scored 3 times in 18 minutes to win 3–2. After this game striker Steven Lenhart declared "Goonies never say die!" (a reference to the movie The Goonies), and this was made into the rally cry of the team.

The Quakes ended the 2012 regular season with 66 points and 72 goals, both team records, with 17 of those points created by goals scored in the 84th minute or later. The team clinched the Supporter's Shield, its first major trophy since their return to San Jose, and qualified for their first CONCACAF Champion's League tournament as a franchise in 2013. They returned to the playoffs for the first time since their 2010 season and faced two games against L.A. Galaxy. In their first playoff game, the Quakes scored a stoppage time goal to take the away leg 1–0, but were knocked out of the playoffs following a 3–1 loss at home (3–2 on aggregate), their only loss at Buck Shaw Stadium for the season.

In 2013, the Quakes began the year facing adversity with numerous players recovering from injury. With added depth in preparation for the upcoming CONCACAF Champions' League, they began the task of duplicating the success of 2012. While the style of scoring late goals were still present in games against New York, Portland and Montreal, the team struggled to find success and quickly found themselves at the bottom of the Western Conference. The slow start of the team led to the departure of coach Frank Yallop and Mark Watson was named interim coach.

On June 29, 2013, the Quakes played the L.A. Galaxy in the California Clásico. Despite being down 2–0 and having Victor Bernardez ejected, the Quakes staged another comeback, scoring twice in stoppage time to win 3–2, becoming the first MLS team to do so.

On August 7, 2013, the Earthquakes debuted in the 2013–14 CONCACAF Champions League for the first time since their return to MLS. They lost the away game to the Montreal Impact 1–0. On October 23, 2013, the Earthquakes won group five on goal differential with a win at home against Heredia, and they moved on to the knockout stage of the tournament.

Despite a league best record in games played after June, the Quakes failed to qualify for the 2013 playoffs, losing the final spot to Colorado on a goal differential tiebreaker. The final home game of the season, a 2–0 win against FC Dallas, saw the final minutes of professional soccer for Ramiro Corrales, who had announced his retirement. Corrales was the last remaining active player who played in the inaugural season of MLS.

The Quakes in their 2014 campaign began, playing in the quarterfinals against Toluca in a two-game series in the 2013–14 CONCACAF Champions League. Scoring a goal in stoppage time in the first game, the Quakes went to Mexico 1–1 on aggregate. In the second game, the game tied in regulation. The Quakes faced Toluca in Overtime where neither team could score against the other and the game went on to penalties. The Earthquakes lost 5–4 against Toluca in penalties and were eliminated.

San Jose ended the 2014 MLS Season with the club's worst ever record, winning only 6 matches, and suffering a 15-match winless streak. That streak surpassed the Quakes' previous record of 13 in 2011, and matched the second worst in league history.

Return of Dominic Kinnear (2015–2017) 

The Earthquakes welcomed back Dominic Kinnear to the club as coach after a nine-year tenure in Houston. The franchise's long-awaited stadium, Avaya Stadium, was the first professional soccer-specific stadium in the Bay Area when it opened on March 22.

The 2015 season was a marked improvement over the previous season, but the Earthquakes still failed to reach the playoffs despite a late surge. Chris Wondolowski became only the ninth player in MLS history to score 100 goals with a penalty in a 1–1 draw against Orlando.

On August 29, 2016, the Earthquakes parted ways with longtime general manager John Doyle. Earthquakes President Dave Kaval stated that he felt the Earthquakes "needed a fresh approach". Technical director Chris Leitch was appointed as interim GM.

The Fioranelli era (2017–2021) 

Following the firing of John Doyle, it was announced on January 5, 2017, that Jesse Fioranelli had been hired as general manager. He joined San Jose from A.S. Roma and had previously also worked at Roma's cross-city rival S.S. Lazio.

Fioranelli made clear early on that he would be prioritizing youth development, international scouting, and generally creating a new identity for San Jose that was younger, more dynamic, and more attacking, intentions which were reflected by his off-season acquisitions of Jahmir Hyka, Florian Jungwirth, Marco Ureña, Harold Cummings, and Danny Hoesen using Targeted Allocation Money. He also expressed the necessity of the team reaching the playoffs in 2017, as it had not done so since 2012. Illustrating the seriousness of his commitment to improving San Jose, within one week in April Fioranelli made two key additions to the technical staff with the hiring of Alex Covelo as Director of Methodology and Bruno Costa as Head of Scouting. Dave Kaval stepped down from his role as president on June 1, to be replaced by former Aston Villa F.C. chief executive and Arsenal F.C. chief commercial officer Tom Fox. On June 22, 2017, San Jose announced Fioranelli's first Designated Player signing, Georgian attacking midfielder Vako, who would join San Jose from SBV Vitesse.

Fioranelli took his ambitions for San Jose a step further just several days later, when he announced on June 25, 2017, that Dominic Kinnear had been fired, and would be replaced immediately and permanently by Chris Leitch, the club's technical director and former interim general manager. Assistant coach John Spencer was also let go, and was replaced by Covelo. The timing of the firing came as somewhat of a surprise, as it was announced hours after San Jose defeated Real Salt Lake 2–1 at home. Fioranelli said of the firing that, coming off of a win, it was not reactionary, and rather he had "in the last two to three months...matured a gut feeling as to where [the club stands]", and that his respect for Kinnear "would not have allowed [him] to want to go for another three months knowing [they] would have parted ways at the end of the season". In his first interview as head coach, Leitch reiterated Fioranelli's previously stated goals, saying that "the goal of the team...is [to] make the playoffs". His first outing as head coach on June 28, 2017, was successful, seeing the Earthquakes achieve their first-ever victory over an MLS side in the U.S. Open Cup with a 2–1 victory against Seattle Sounders FC that would advance them to the USOC quarter finals for the first time since 2012.

Leitch's first MLS match as head coach was a 2–1 win over the LA Galaxy at Stanford Stadium on July 1, in which Chris Wondolowski scored the equalizing goal off of an assist from goalkeeper David Bingham and substitute Shea Salinas scored the winner in the 93rd minute. The team experienced its first loss under Leitch three days later on July 4 at Bobby Dodd Stadium, in a 4–2 loss to Atlanta United FC following red cards to both Kofi Sarkodie and Victor Bernardez; however, this match also saw Tommy Thompson score his first league goal and Chris Wondolowski break Ramiro Corrales' record for career starts at San Jose with his 229th start, as well as tie the league record for most goals scored away at 63.

On July 7, 2017, a multi-year collaboration between the Earthquakes and the German Football Association was announced, "focused on knowledge exchange, game development and machine learning".

On July 10, 2017, the Earthquakes defeated the Galaxy 3–2 at home, following a brace from Chris Wondolowski and Danny Hoesen's second goal of the tournament, to advance to the semifinals of the U.S. Open Cup for the first time since 2004 and for only the second time in club history. Wondolowski wore the number 38 in this match in honor of teammate Matheus Silva, who nearly drowned the previous week. New signing Vako was introduced at the club for the first time during halftime. Vako made his club debut four days later as a 63rd minute substitution in San Jose's 4–1 friendly defeat of Eintracht Frankfurt, and shortly afterwards scored in his MLS debut as a halftime substitute against the New York Red Bulls at Red Bull Arena on July 19.

The Earthquakes announced a second new partnership aimed at pursuing the implementation of artificial intelligence and machine learning on July 21 with Los Angeles-based company Second Spectrum, Inc., the first of its kind in the league and inspired by the company's partnerships with the NBA and specifically the Golden State Warriors. Per this agreement, a new system was installed at Avaya Stadium to track players during matches and gather data on tactics and performance, to be delivered to players' mobile devices directly after games. The signing of Swiss defender François Affolter from FC Luzern was announced later the same day.

San Jose lost in the Open Cup semifinals to Sporting Kansas City, for the second time in franchise history, in sudden death penalties on August 9.

On August 19, Wondolowski became the first player in MLS history to score ten or more goals in eight consecutive seasons, following his successful penalty kick in the dying moments of a 2–2 home draw against the Philadelphia Union, when Shea Salinas was tripped in the box by Joshua Yaro.

San Jose qualified for the 2017 MLS Cup Playoffs, the club's first playoff appearance since 2012, following a 3–2 win at home on October 22 over Minnesota United FC in which Danny Hoesen and Chris Wondolowski each recorded a goal and an assist, and substitute Marco Ureña scored the stoppage time winner. This sent the team on to play a knockout round match on the road against Vancouver Whitecaps FC on October 25. However, the team was defeated 5–0.

On November 24, 2017, Mikael Stahre, formerly of BK Häcken, was announced as the team's new head coach. Leitch returned to his previous role as the club's technical director. San Jose began to make roster moves not long after with contract options being declined for players, most notably for defender Víctor Bernárdez and goalkeeper David Bingham who spent six and seven years with the Earthquakes organization respectively. San Jose traded Bingham's MLS rights to their rival Los Angeles Galaxy on December 18. December also brought additions to the roster, reflecting different aspects of San Jose's leadership and management. On December 1, 2017, Joel Qwiberg was signed from IF Brommapojkarna where he had helped to lead the team to two consecutive promotions, reaching Sweden's topic league. The next signing of the off-season was homegrown goalkeeper JT Marcinkowski, who had finished his 3rd year at Georgetown. Just over a week later, San Jose announced in a joint press conference with their USL affiliate Reno 1868 that they had signed three players from the team: Luis Felipe, Chris Wehan, and Jimmy Ockford. Reno's club president elaborated on what the signings meant for both organizations, stating "Today's news delivers on that promise to compete in Reno while developing the future of San Jose." The next day San Jose continued on their developmental based signings with defender Jacob Akanyirige announced as signed straight from their academy at fifteen years old, San Jose's youngest ever player and the eighth youngest player in MLS history. On December 20, the first Designated Player and second Swedish signing under Stahre's tenure was officially brought to San Jose. Magnus Eriksson joined from Djurgårdens IF where he co-led the Allsvenskan as top scorer in the 2017 season.

Stahre was dismissed by the club before the end of his first year in charge, a season in which the team earned just four wins. On October 8, 2018, the club announced that they had hired reigning CONCACAF coach of the year Matias Almeyda, who would take charge for the 2019 season. On May 18, 2019, Wondolowski scored four goals against Chicago Fire. With his second goal, he set the league's all-time scoring record. The team had a negative record and missed the playoffs by four points.

In 2020, the Earthquakes had a draw and a loss in their first two regular season games before the season was shut down due to the COVID-19 pandemic. When the season resumed with the MLS is Back Tournament, the Earthquakes were drawn into Group B with FC Dallas (later replaced by the Chicago Fire), Seattle Sounders FC, and Vancouver Whitecaps FC. They drew with Seattle and defeated both Chicago and Vancouver, the latter with a thrilling comeback from a 3–1 deficit, to win the group and advance to the round of 16.

On April 18, 2022, the Earthquakes and Matias Almeyda agreed to part ways. Alex Covelo, the head coach of the newly established San Jose Earthquakes II side, stepped in as his interim replacement. Covelo was joined by an assistant coaching staff consisting of former San Jose player Chris Wondolowski, former assistant manager and interim manager Steve Ralston, and Earthquakes II assistant Luciano Fusco.

Crest and shirt 
Since their inception, the Earthquakes have played in a color scheme featuring blue and black as dominant colors, usually with white highlights. The original San Jose Clash logo featured a stylized scorpion in black and red with a white 'clash' wordmark.

When they rebranded to the Earthquakes in 2000, the team badge featured an inverted triangular shield containing a soccer ball invoking the rising sun used in the logo for the City of San Jose, a stylized 'Earthquakes' wordmark, and a color palette of blue, black, white and silver. The three points of the triangular shield represented the three largest communities of the Bay Area (San Jose, San Francisco and Oakland).

The team rebranded again on January 30, 2014, to a new crest and uniform. While still featuring blue and black, as well as a new chevron design that invokes the geologic theme of the team's name, the new design also featured the year 1974 in red; this is an explicit reference of lineage to the previous NASL incarnation of the Earthquakes that had founded that year.

On February 17, 2017, San Jose released its new home kit at a jersey release party at San Pedro Square. The new kit is black, a callback to the black Goonies kits of the historic 2012 season, and features the blue slipstrike design from the crest on the front. Also included is a red neck tape, referring again to the team's NASL history, "SJ 74" in blue on the bottom left corner, and the words "UNITY", "DEVOTION", and "HERITAGE" written in white across the blue border on the right sleeve.

On February 11, 2018, the Earthquakes released their new away kit, the Navy SEAL Foundation Jersey, and announced that 5% of each jersey sale would be donated to the Foundation, becoming the first club in MLS history to donate part of its jersey revenue to a nonprofit organization. The jersey release party was held near the site of the USS Hornet Museum and the kit itself presented by a retired SEAL alongside squad members Tommy Thompson, Joel Qwiberg, and, offshore in a military rescue boat, Nick Lima and Jackson Yueill.

Uniform history 
Home

Away

Stadium 

U.S. Open Cup:
 Negoesco Stadium: San Francisco, California (July 24, 2001) vs LA Galaxy
 Cagan Stadium: Stanford, California (2011–2012)
 Kezar Stadium: San Francisco, California (2012, 2014)

On January 13, 2007, the San Jose Mercury News reported that the city of San Jose, San Jose State University and the Earthquakes owners were in negotiations to build a soccer stadium just east of the Earthquakes' previous home, Spartan Stadium. The new facility, to have 22,000 permanent seats but be expandable to a capacity of 30,000 for single games, would be privately built by Lewis Wolff and John Fisher, the primary owners of the Earthquakes, with San Jose State providing the needed land. Additionally, the team and the university would build community soccer fields across Senter Road in Kelley Park using San Jose municipal bond money that had been approved years earlier for the purpose but never spent. The plan was for the new version of the San Jose Earthquakes to play in Spartan Stadium during the 2008 MLS season, then move into the new stadium in 2009. Plans for the stadium collapsed on April 19 of that year after the Earthquakes and SJSU could not come to an agreement on revenue sharing.

PayPal Park 
On May 8, the city of San Jose and Earthquakes Soccer, LLC confirmed that their new primary focus was on a site near San Jose International Airport on the site of the former FMC plant. The new site was owned by the city, which was exploring either leasing it to Earthquakes Soccer, LLC or selling it outright. The  site is adjacent to not only the airport but the planned BART extension to Santa Clara and the existing Santa Clara Caltrain station, and near both Interstate 880 and U.S. Route 101. On June 12, 2007, the San Jose City Council voted unanimously to enter into a Memorandum of Understanding to explore construction of a new stadium to bring MLS back to San Jose and adopted a resolution authorizing the city manager to enter into an Exclusive Right to Negotiate agreement with Wolff and his partners regarding the potential development of the former FMC site. The first payment on the new stadium land of $3 million was made in June 2008.

The preliminary designs were released to the public on September 19, 2009. Earthquakes Stadium was slated to be a three-sided European style stadium with 18,000 permanent seats and a grass berm at the open end.

On March 16, 2010, the San Jose city council voted 9–0 to rezone the Airport West property to allow for development of the new Earthquakes Stadium.

The San Jose Earthquakes franchise made history when 6,256 people participated in groundbreaking for the new stadium. This set a world record by Guinness World Records as the largest ever crowd to participate in a groundbreaking ceremony. The construction was completed in early 2015 and hosted its first event, a friendly, pre-season match against LA Galaxy, on February 28, 2015. The stadium's official opening took place on March 22, 2015, when the Earthquakes hosted Chicago Fire for their first home game of the 2015 MLS regular season. Fatai Alashe scored the first official, regular-season goal at Avaya in the fifth minute of the 2–1 victory.

Club culture

Rivalries 

The California Clásico is a rivalry between two Major League Soccer teams, the LA Galaxy and the San Jose Earthquakes, which existed from 1996 to 2005 and was resumed in 2008. It is considered to be one of the oldest rivalries in American soccer. The rivalry originated from the historical Northern California vs. Southern California sporting and cultural rivalries, as well as from the relative proximity of the cities (about 360 miles apart) which allows rival fans to attend each other's games. While there have been several players to play for both teams beforehand, the rivalry intensified after the Anschutz Entertainment Group (owner of the Los Angeles Galaxy) took sole ownership of the San Jose Earthquakes in December 2002. The rivalry reached its peak from 2001 to 2005, during which time the Earthquakes and the Galaxy combined to win four MLS Cup titles in a five-year period. Both clubs reached MLS Cup 2001, with San Jose posting a 2–1 overtime victory on goals by Landon Donovan and Dwayne DeRosario.

The Heritage Cup with Seattle Sounders FC was begun in the 2009 MLS season by the respective supporters' groups. Any present or future MLS teams that carry on the names of their NASL predecessors are eligible for the Cup, but supporters of the other eligible MLS teams (Portland Timbers and Vancouver Whitecaps) have chosen not to participate. San Jose and Seattle have had a rivalry since the NASL. However, it did not completely resurface during the 2009 season with fans of both teams viewing other clubs as bigger rivals. That season, the first MLS meeting of the teams was not considered for the competition due to the schedule consisting of two games in Seattle and only one in San Jose. Seattle won the initial meeting at home 2–0 and the second 2–1. The Earthquakes won the inaugural cup on goals scored after a 4–0 home victory on August 2, 2009.

Support 

Among the supporters' groups affiliated with the Earthquakes are the San Jose Ultras, Club Quake, Soccer Silicon Valley, The Casbah, The Faultline, and Epicentro74.

An Earthquakes fan was arrested for assaulting a Portland Timbers fan after taunting the group in April 2013. The 1906 Ultras responded via Twitter: "arrests issue addressed" and to be "moving beyond the issue" ahead of a travel ban that was lifted by Major League Soccer just days prior.

Punk musician, Lars Frederiksen is a supporter of the Earthquakes. Along with his band, The Old Firm Casuals, he wrote the new anthem and theme song, "Never Say Die", for the club, which was performed as part of the team's rebranding ceremony on January 30, 2014. The song features backing vocals by various team members. Frederiksen said of the team that they are the most "punk rock" team in the MLS.

Mascots 
 José Clash (1996–1999)
 Rikter the CyberDog (2000–2002)
 Q (2004–2005), (2008–present)

There was no mascot in 2003.

On April 26, 2010, Q was one of three mascots featured on KNTV, along with San Jose Sharks mascot S.J. Sharkie and San Jose Giants mascot "Gigante".

Revenue and profitability
At the beginning of 2013, the Quakes had 5,000 season ticket holders, and although revenues had been increasing, the Quakes stadium did not allow them to generate sufficient revenues to be profitable.  Quakes management predicted in 2013 that season ticket sales would double once they move into their new stadium, and the Quakes would become profitable at that time. Management also stated that they are "pursuing independent revenue streams that will provide the team with real and lasting financial freedom." With the completion of their new soccer-specific Avaya Stadium, in early 2015 the Earthquakes reached their cap of 12,000 season tickets sold.

Sponsorship

Broadcasting 
From 2023, every Earthquakes game will be carried on MLS Season Pass on the Apple TV app. Prior to the streaming deal, the Earthquakes were seen on TV across the Bay Area on a number of stations, with the most recent linear partner being cable outlets NBC Sports Bay Area and NBC Sports California.

On the radio, all Earthquakes games are broadcast in English on 810 KGO (since 2023) and in Spanish on 1370 KZSF (since 2011). The English-language broadcast features Ted Ramey as the play-by-play announcer, and former Earthquakes goalie Joe Cannon as the color analyst. Carlos Cesar Rivera serves as the Spanish-language play-by-play announcer.

Players and staff

Roster

Team management

Honors

Team 
MLS Cup
 Champions (2): 2001, 2003
Supporters' Shield
 Champions (2): 2005, 2012
 Individual Club Awards
MLS Fair Play Award: 2001, 2010

Player

Record

Year-by-year 

This is a partial list of the last five seasons completed by the Quakes. For the full season-by-season history, see List of San Jose Earthquakes seasons.

1. Avg. attendance include statistics from league matches only.
2. Top goalscorer(s) includes all goals scored in League, MLS Cup Playoffs, U.S. Open Cup, MLS is Back Tournament, CONCACAF Champions League, FIFA Club World Cup, and other competitive continental matches.

International tournaments 

2002 CONCACAF Champions' Cup
 First Round v.  Club Deportivo Olimpia – 1:0, 3:1 (Earthquakes advanced 4:1 on aggregate)
 Quarter-Finals v.  C.F. Pachuca – 0:3, 1:0 (Pachuca advanced 3:1 on aggregate)

 2003 La Manga Cup
 Group stage v.  Rosenborg BK – 0:2
 Group stage v.  FC Rubin Kazan – 1:1
 Group stage v.  Viking FK – 1:3
 Seventh place match v.  Lyn Oslo – 3:1

2003 CONCACAF Champions' Cup
 First Round v.  C.S.D. Municipal – 2:4, 2:1 (Municipal advanced 5:4 on aggregate)

 2004 La Manga Cup
 Group stage v.  GIF Sundsvall – 3:1
 Group stage v.  Stabæk Fotball – 2:1
 Semi-finals v.  Viking FK – 1:1 (Viking Stavanger advanced 5:3 on penalties)
 Third place match v.  FC Dynamo Kyiv – 1:1 (Earthquakes won 6:5 on penalties)

2004 CONCACAF Champions' Cup
 Quarter-Finals v.  L.D. Alajuelense – 0:3, 1:0 (Alajuelense advanced 3:1 on aggregate)

2013–14 CONCACAF Champions League
 Group stage v.  Montreal Impact – 0:1
 Group stage v.  Heredia Jaguares de Peten – 0:1
 Group stage v.  Montreal Impact – 3:0
 Group stage v.  Heredia Jaguares de Peten – 1:0
 Quarterfinals v.  Deportivo Toluca F.C. – 1:1, 1:1 (Toluca advanced 5:4 on penalties)

Player records

Career records 
Statistics below are for all-time leaders. Statistics are for regular season only. Bold indicates active players.

Single-season records

Leadership and players

Hall of Fame 

Players 
  John Doyle (inducted 2005)
  Ronald Cerritos (inducted 2010)
  Troy Dayak (inducted 2011)
  Paul Child (inducted 2012)
  Momčilo Gavrić (inducted 2013)
  Johnny Moore (inducted 2014)
  Ramiro Corrales (inducted 2015)
  Joe Cannon (inducted 2017)
  Chris Dangerfield (inducted 2018)
  Jon Busch (inducted 2018)
  Richard Mulrooney (inducted 2019)

Builders 
  Milan Mandarić (inducted 2012)
  Peter Bridgwater (inducted 2013)

Staff 
  Dave Obenour (inducted 2019)
  Frank Yallop (inducted 2022)

Team captains

Head coaches

General managers

Ownership 
 Major League Soccer (1996–98)
 Kraft Sports Group (1999–00)
 Silicon Valley Sports & Entertainment (2001)
 Silicon Valley Sports & Entertainment (Operations) / Anschutz Entertainment Group (Investment) (2002)
 Anschutz Entertainment Group (2003–05)
 Earthquakes Soccer, LLC (2007–)

See also 

 San Jose Earthquakes (1974–88)
 2007 MLS Expansion Draft
 List of San Jose Earthquakes rosters

References

External links 

 

 
Association football clubs established in 1974
E
1974 establishments in California
Phoenix clubs (association football)
Major League Soccer teams